PCem (short for PC Emulator) is an IBM PC emulator for Windows and Linux that specializes in running old operating systems and software that are designed for IBM PC compatibles. Originally developed as an IBM PC XT emulator, it later added support for other IBM PC compatible computers as well.

A fork known as 86Box is also available, which includes a number of added features, such as support for SCSI and additional boards.

On 14 June 2021, lead developer Sarah Walker announced her departure from the project. A new maintainer, Michael Manley, was appointed on 18 December 2021. During the interim period with no maintainer, the project's forums were closed.

Features

Hardware 
PCem is capable of emulating Intel processors (and its respective clones, including AMD, IDT and Cyrix) from Intel 8088 through the Pentium Tillamook MMX/Mobile MMX processors from 1997 until 1999. A recompiler has been added in v10.1, being mandatory for P5 Pentium and Cyrix processors and optional for i486 processors and IDT WinChip processors. Yet a rather fast processor is needed for full emulation speed (such as an Intel Core i5 at 4 GHz). However, the current developer of PCem has a main concern that the recompiler is not fast enough to emulate the Intel Pentium Pro/Pentium II processors yet.

PCem emulates various IBM PC compatible systems/motherboards from 1981 until 1996, this includes almost all IBM PC models (including the IBM PS/1 model 2121 and the IBM PS/2 model 2011), some American Megatrends BIOS clones (from 1989 until 1994), Award BIOS systems (Award 286 clone, Award SiS 496/497 and Award 430VX PCI), and Intel Premiere/PCI and Intel Advanced/EV motherboards. However, unofficial builds of PCem (PCem-X and PCem-unofficial) also supports IBM PC compatible systems/motherboards (from 1996 until 2000) that supports Intel Pentium Pro/Pentium II processors. PCem simulates the BIOS cache, which relies on the processor rather than on system memory.

PCem can emulate different graphic modes, this includes text mode, Hercules, CGA (including some composite modes and the 160 × 100 × 16 tweaked modes), Tandy, EGA, VGA (including Mode X and other tweaks), VESA, as well as various video APIs such as DirectX and 3Dfx's Glide. PCem can also emulate various video cards such as the ATI Mach64 GX and the S3 Trio32/64/Virge series.

PCem also emulates some sound cards, such as the AdLib, Sound Blaster (including the Game Blaster), Sound Blaster Pro, Sound Blaster 16, Sound Blaster AWE32, Gravis UltraSound, Innovation SSI-2001, Aztech Sound Galaxy Pro 16, Windows Sound System, Ensoniq AudioPCI 64V/ES1371, and Sound Blaster PCI 128.

Voodoo cards are also emulated since PCem v10 and PCem v12, which added support for Voodoo 2 and various optimizations. However, there are some shortcomings regarding Voodoo emulation such as the lack of mipmapping, slightly wobbling triangles, lack of speed limiting, and inaccurate refresh rates on almost every resolution (except 640 × 480@60 Hz). As of PCem v11, a separate recompiler has been added for Voodoo emulation, making it faster to emulate the Voodoo graphics card.

An unofficial build of PCem allows usage of SLiRP/WinPcap as a networking interface, plus emulated NE2000 and Realtek RTL8029AS Ethernet cards. However, starting with PCem v13, the emulation of NE2000 was officially added.

Operating system support 
Similar to Virtual PC, Bochs and QEMU, it emulates almost all versions of Microsoft Windows until Windows Vista (including Service Pack 2), MS-DOS, FreeDOS and CP/M-86 are also supported. Earlier versions of OS/2 requires the hard drive to be formatted prior to installation, while OS/2 Warp 3 until Warp 4.5 requires an unaccelerated video card to run. Other operating systems are also supported on PCem, such as versions of Linux that supports the Pentium processor, BSD derivatives (e.g. FreeBSD), and BeOS 5, which only works on the Award SiS 497 motherboard.

Version history 
Versions of PCem from v0.5 until v8 have been removed from the official webpage, due to the use of the MAME OPL2/OPL3 emulation code from when it was not yet licensed under a GPL-compatible license.

See also 
 DOSBox
 DOSEMU
 QEMU
 Bochs
 Parallels
 VirtualBox
 VMware Fusion
 VMware Workstation
 Windows Virtual PC

References 

2007 software
DOS emulators
DOS on IBM PC compatibles
Free emulation software
Free software programmed in C
Linux emulation software
Windows emulation software
X86 emulators